Austrolestes aleison is an Australian species of damselfly in the family Lestidae,
commonly known as a western ringtail. 
It is endemic to south-western Australia, where it inhabits pools, ponds and lakes.

Austrolestes aleison is a medium-sized to large damselfly, the male is blue and black.

Etymology 
The word aleison is from the greek word ἄλεισον, meaning a goblet. In 1979, Tony Watson and Max Moulds named this species of damselfly after the goblet-shape of the mark on segment 2 of the male abdomen.

Gallery

See also
 List of Odonata species of Australia

References 

Lestidae
Odonata of Australia
Insects of Australia
Endemic fauna of Australia
Taxa named by J.A.L. (Tony) Watson
Taxa named by Maxwell Sydney Moulds
Insects described in 1979
Damselflies